William Whittington was a US politician.

William Whittington may also refer to:

William Whittington (MP) for Gloucestershire (UK Parliament constituency)
Bill Whittington, American racing driver